Pitthea continua is a moth of the family Geometridae first described by Francis Walker in 1854.

Distribution
It is found in Cameroon, the Democratic Republic of the Congo, Gabon, Ghana, Nigeria, Sierra Leone and Uganda.

References

External links
 "Pitthea continua Walker, 1854". African Moths.

Ennominae
Moths of Africa
Insects of the Democratic Republic of the Congo
Insects of West Africa
Insects of Uganda
Fauna of Gabon